Čakanovce (before 1927 Čakanová) is a village and municipality in the Lučenec District in the Banská Bystrica Region of Slovakia.

History
The village arose in the 13th or 14th century. It was first mentioned in 1439 (Chakanhaza). It changed many owners during the history. From 1554 to 1594 it was occupied by the Turks. It suffered war devastations very much in the 17th century. From 1938 to 1944 it belonged to Hungary under the First Vienna Award.

Genealogical resources

The records for genealogical research are available at the state archive "Statny Archiv in Banska Bystrica, Slovakia"

 Roman Catholic church records (births/marriages/deaths): 1785-1897 (parish B)
 Lutheran church records (births/marriages/deaths): 1783-1895 (parish B)

See also
 List of municipalities and towns in Slovakia

External links
http://www.statistics.sk/mosmis/eng/run.html
http://www.e-obce.sk/obec/cakanovce/cakanovce.html
Surnames of living people in Cakanovce

Villages and municipalities in Lučenec District